Comfa (or Komfa) is a folk religion in Guyana also known as Spiritualism or Faithism. The word "Comfa" is used by non-practitioners as a generic term for spirit possession in Guyana. However, the word "Comfa" is also a term to define the greater folk religion involving spirit possession originating in Guyana.

History
The origins of Comfa come from the many religious traditions of the many peoples who settled in Guyana. Of these beliefs the main influences are from African traditional practices, specifically Kongo religion, Christianity and some elements from indigenous peoples. The main Kongo influences on Comfa are the cosmology believed and the idea that the world can be altered through the creation and use of charms. It is also linked to the Ghanaian practice of Akom, which involves spirit possess or trance dancing. The name is taken from "Okomfa" the traditional priests in Ghana, the most well known being Okomfo Anokye who summoned the golden stool to establish the Ashanti empire.

Comfa can be traced back to early worship of the water spirit "Watermamma" (known as Mami Wata elsewhere) amongst enslaved Guyanese. After emancipation Christian missionaries began to try populate Guiana and their teachings began to influence early Comfa beliefs. By the 1880s a man named Joseph MacLaren from Grenada along with Nathaniel Jordan founded a church in Guiana and formally began teaching Comfa practices under the title of "Faithism," popularly called the Jordanites.

Beliefs

Cosmology
The cosmos are made up of a realm known as the "Heights" inhabited by Christian figures like angels, biblical prophets, and apostles. At the center of the universe is nature and humans. Below the natural world is the "Terrestrial Realm" where dead souls dwell. God resides outside of these realms because he is the creator and protector of all things, because these spirits have already gone through life they possess a wisdom to advise those who are currently living. Of these spirits there are differences: there are entrees, deities, family, and friends spirits. The entrees are spirits embodying seven different ethnic groups that shaped Guyana: Africans, Indigenous people, Chinese, Dutch, East Indians, English, and Spanish. The deity spirits are the Hindu gods. The family and friends spirits are those who are family or friends of the deities or entrees. The terrestrial spirits reside in the sea and in creeks but spirits still close to Mother Earth may still reside on Earth.

Mother Earth is the entity that spurs on life on Earth. Within Mother Earth rests graveyard residing spirits and wandering spirits who have been called for but never returned to the graveyard.

Orisha worship and Ifa practices coming from Yoruba religion are also present in the practices and worldview of Comfa.

Worship
At Celestial Services a worshiper may pray to god and ask for things he/she desires, and certain spirits may be asked to assist in realizing these desires. At a Work service the spirits of an Entree may be called upon while practitioners dance to the beat of drums. Spirits may pass by and manifest themselves in the practitioners.

See also
 Kumina
 Myal

References

Afro-American religion
Guyanese culture
Religion in Guyana
Kongo culture